Bhagat Bhikhan 
() (1480-1573), a medieval Indian Hindu Bhakti Poet-Saint, whose two hymns are included in the Guru Granth Sahib. There were two saints of that time sharing the same name — Bhagat Bhikhan and Sheikh Bhikhan, the Sufi.

Early Life
He was born in a Hindu family, at Kakori near Lucknow in present-day Uttar Pradesh state in India. Bhagat Bhikhan was a devotee in the tradition of Bhagat Ravidas and Bhagat Dhanna (Ramanandi Sampradaya).

Legacy
His hymns in the Guru Granth Sahib reflect his dedication to the Name of God which he describes as "cure for all ills of the world."

Bhagat Bhikhan was the most learnt of the learned men of the time of Emperor Akbar. For many years, he was engaged in teaching and instructing the people. He left several children who were adorned with piety, wisdom, knowledge and virtue.

See Also
 Ramanandi Sampradaya

References
 Excerpts taken from Encyclopedia of Sikhism by Harbans Singh. Published by Punjabi University, Patiala
 The Sikh Religion, Vol 6,, Max Arthur MacAuliff,  Oxford University Press, 1909.

 Sikh Bhagats